Bardia is a suburb of Sydney, in the state of New South Wales, Australia, located 38 kilometres south-west of the Sydney central business district, between Campbelltown and Liverpool. It is part of the Macarthur region.

History
The suburb got its name from the "Bardia Barracks" at Ingleburn which were named in honour of the successful engagement of the local 16th division in the Battle of Bardia, the first Australian action in World War II. Bardia was gazetted as a suburb on 18 December 2009.

Education
There is one public school in the area. Bardia Public School, which was renamed from Ingleburn North Public School on 5 May 2015, is located on MacDonald Road.

References

Suburbs of Sydney
City of Liverpool (New South Wales)
City of Campbelltown (New South Wales)